A purse is a small bag that may refer to:

 Coin purse, small pouch made for carrying coins
 Handbag, in American English
 Money bag
 Wallet

Purse may also refer to:

 Purse (horse racing), the total amount of money paid out to the owners of horses racing at a particular track over a given period
 Prize money, "purse", or "purse money", a monetary reward paid out to the crew of a ship for capturing an enemy vessel
 Purse bid, in boxing the aggregate prize money
 Purse (surname), a surname
 Purse State Park, a state park in Charles County, Maryland
 Privy Purse, money in the past British monarchy raised from the income of the Crown Estate lands and holdings
 La Bourse ("purse" in French), a short story by French novelist Honoré de Balzac

See also 
 
 

 Purser (disambiguation)
 Parse, in computing and linguistics
 Peirce (disambiguation)
 Perse (disambiguation)
 Percy (disambiguation)
 Purce

Payments